Jorge Alberto Juraidini Rumilla (born 6 March 1960) is a Mexican politician from the Institutional Revolutionary Party. From 2009 to 2012 he served as Deputy of the LXI Legislature of the Mexican Congress representing Puebla.

References

1960 births
Living people
Politicians from Puebla
Institutional Revolutionary Party politicians
21st-century Mexican politicians
People from Teziutlán
Monterrey Institute of Technology and Higher Education alumni
Deputies of the LXI Legislature of Mexico
Members of the Chamber of Deputies (Mexico) for Puebla